The 2010 Soweto Open was a professional tennis tournament played on hard courts. It was part of the 2010 ATP Challenger Tour. It took place in Johannesburg, South Africa between 12 and 18 April 2010.

ATP entrants

Seeds

 Rankings are as of 5 April 2010.

Other entrants
The following players received wildcards into the singles main draw:
  Rik de Voest
  Raven Klaasen
  Ruan Roelofse
  Nikala Scholtz

The following players received entry from the qualifying draw:
  Chris Eaton
  Denys Molchanov
  Noam Okun
  Alexander Peya

Champions

Singles

 Dustin Brown def.  Izak van der Merwe, 7–6(2), 6–3

Doubles

 Nicolas Mahut /  Lovro Zovko def.  Raven Klaasen /  Izak van der Merwe, 6–2, 6–2

References
2010 Draws
South Africa Tennis Association official website
ITF search 

Soweto Open
Tennis tournaments in South Africa
Soweto Open
Sow
Soweto Open